Ferrando is an Italian surname.

Notable people
Notable people with the surname include:
 José Luis Adsuar Ferrando, Spanish politician
 Linda Ferrando, Italian tennis player
 Luigi Ferrando, Italian bishop
 Marco Ferrando, Italian politician
 Martín Ferrando, Uruguayan footballer
 Rafael Ferrando, Spanish astronomer
 Salvador Ferrando, Mexican painter
 Stephen Ferrando, Italian missionary